Chilamboli is a 1963 Indian Malayalam-language film, directed by G. K. Ramu and produced by Kalyanakrishna Iyer. The film stars Prem Nazir, Sukumari, Adoor Bhasi and Thikkurissy Sukumaran Nair. The film had musical score by V. Dakshinamoorthy.

Cast
 
Prem Nazir 
Ragini 
Adoor Bhasi 
Thikkurissy Sukumaran Nair 
T. S. Muthaiah 
Adoor Pankajam 
Ambika 
Baby Vilasini
Baby Vinodini 
Kumari Santha
S. P. Pillai

Soundtrack

References

External links
 

1963 films
1960s Malayalam-language films
Indian biographical drama films
Films about courtesans in India